The Roxy Theatre in  Langdon, North Dakota, United States, in the center of the Langdon business district, was built in 1936 in Early Commercial architecture.  It was listed on the National Register of Historic Places in 1998.

It's a tall, narrow building. It was designed by Devils Lake architect John Marshall (1864–1949), from Scotland, a former president of the North Dakota State Architects Association.

The theatre "was open continuously from 1936 till January 1995."

References

Theatres completed in 1936
Buildings designated early commercial in the National Register of Historic Places
Theatres on the National Register of Historic Places in North Dakota
National Register of Historic Places in Cavalier County, North Dakota
1936 establishments in North Dakota